The Fahrenheit hydrometer is a device used to measure the density of a liquid.  It was invented by Daniel Gabriel Fahrenheit (1686–1736), better known for his work in thermometry.

Operation 

The Fahrenheit hydrometer is a constant-volume device that will float in water.  In the figure shown here, the hydrometer is floating vertically in a cylinder containing a liquid.  At the bottom of the hydrometer is a weighted bulb and at the top is a pan for small weights.  To use the hydrometer, one first accurately determines its weight (W) while it is dry.  Next, the device is placed in water, and a weight (w) sufficient to sink a marked point on the rod to the water-line is placed on the pan.  At that point, the weight of water displaced by the instrument equals W + w. The hydrometer is then removed, wiped dry, and placed in the liquid whose density is to be determined. A weight (x) sufficient to sink the hydrometer to the same marked point is placed in the pan.  The density (D) of the second liquid is then given by D = (W + x) / (W + w).

The Fahrenheit hydrometer can be made of either glass or metal.

The Nicholson hydrometer is similar in design, but instead of a weighted bulb at the bottom there is a small container ("basket") into which a sample can be placed.

See also 

 Hydrometer

References 

Measuring instruments
Dutch inventions